Zachary Michael Sanford (born November 9, 1994) is an American professional ice hockey forward for the Milwaukee Admirals in the American Hockey League (AHL) while under contract to the Nashville Predators of the National Hockey League (NHL). Sanford won the Stanley Cup with the St. Louis Blues in 2019.

Playing career

Early career
Sanford was born in Salem, Massachusetts before moving to Manchester, New Hampshire and attending Pinkerton Academy. During the 2011–12 season at Pinkerton, Sanford led the team to a Division 1 state title with 36 goals and 69 points. After earning the honor of New Hampshire High School Player of the Year, Sanford joined the Islanders Hockey Club of the Eastern Junior Hockey League (EJHL), recording 36 points in 37 games.

While with the Islanders, Sanford committed to play collegiate hockey for the Boston College Eagles men's ice hockey in Division I of the National Collegiate Athletic Association (NCAA) in March 2013. During his first year of NHL draft eligibility, Sanford started off ranking 83rd amongst North American skaters by the NHL Central Scouting Bureau but soon raised his rank to 60th overall. He was shortly thereafter picked in the 2013 NHL Entry Draft in the second round, 61st overall by the Washington Capitals. After being drafted 61st overall in the 2013 NHL Entry Draft by the Washington Capitals, Sanford joined the Waterloo Black Hawks of the United States Hockey League.

Collegiate
Sanford officially joined the Boston Eagles for the 2014–15 season where he scored 24 points in 38 games. He recorded his first collegiate goal on November 14 against Michigan State in a 3–2 win. He finished the season tied for fourth on the team with 17 assists. In his sophomore season with the Eagles in 2015–16, Sanford continued his offensive output and recorded 39 points in 40 games as the team qualified for the Frozen Four. On July 11, 2016, Sanford embarked on his professional career in signing a three-year, entry-level contract with the Washington Capitals.

Professional

Washington Capitals
After attending the Capitals training camp and having made an impact in the pre-season, Sanford made the Capitals opening night roster for the 2016–17 season. He made his NHL debut on October 13, 2016, against the defending Stanley Cup Champion Pittsburgh Penguins and had one shot on goal. After being sent down to American Hockey League (AHL) affiliate, the Hershey Bears, he was recalled up to the NHL on February 10. He scored his first career NHL goal on February 11, 2017, against the Anaheim Ducks. Sanford added another goal and assist in 26 games with the Capitals before he was traded to the St. Louis Blues as part of a package for defenceman Kevin Shattenkirk on February 27, 2017.

St. Louis Blues
Sanford scored his first goal as a Blue on March 16, 2017, against the San Jose Sharks in a 4–1 win. At the time of the trade, Sanford was being discussed as the future second or third line center in St. Louis. He finished the season with two goals and five points in thirteen games with the Blues after the trade.

At the beginning of the 2017–18 season, Sanford suffered a dislocated shoulder in training camp and underwent surgery. He was activated from the injured list on February 15, 2018 and re-assigned to the Blues AHL affiliate, the San Antonio Rampage.

The following season, Sanford had a good training camp, but missed some time due to the death of his father. As a result he started the 2018–19 season with San Antonio. He was recalled on October 16, 2018 after the Blues had been depleted by injuries. During a Blues practice on December 10, 2018, Sanford fought teammate Robert Bortuzzo. The two got a few punches in on one another before being separated by coaches. At the time, St. Louis had lost eight of their last 11 games. He was re-assigned to San Antonio on December 15, 2018, but recalled just two days later. He was sent down again to San Antonio in December and recalled in January.

By January 2019, the Blues were in last place around the entire league resulting in a coaching and goaltender change. The changes proved to be successful as Sanford ended the regular season playing in 60 regular-season games and accumulating 20 points and the team qualified for the 2019 Stanley Cup playoffs. As the Blues met the Boston Bruins in the 2019 Stanley Cup Finals, Sanford recorded his only goal of the postseason during Game 7 as the Blues earned their first Stanley Cup in their 52-year franchise history. Despite being a Stanley Cup winner, he was still unknown at this time as sports broadcasters were calling him irrelevant.

On July 9, 2019 Sanford signed a two-year extension with the Blues. During the 2019–20 season, Sanford achieved a rare four-goal performance in a 6–5 loss to the Vegas Golden Knights. It was also Sanford's first career hat trick and the first time a Blues' player scored four goals in a game in over five years. He also had a four points in a game on November 22, 2019 and a three-point game on February 26, 2020.

During the pandemic-shortened 2020–21 season, Sanford scored two goals in a 5–4 win over the Anaheim Ducks on March 2, 2021. He finished the season with 16 points in 52 games. On August 4, 2021, Sanford signed a one-year contract with the Blues.

Ottawa Senators and Winnipeg Jets
On September 25, 2021, Sanford was traded to the Ottawa Senators for Logan Brown and a conditional 4th round pick. In 50 games with the Senators, he scored nine goals and seventeen points.

With the Senators out of playoff contention, and while in the last season of his contract, Sanford was traded to the Winnipeg Jets in exchange for a 2022 fifth round round pick at the NHL trade deadline on March 21, 2022. He played 30 games for Winnipeg, scoring four points. The Jets would ultimately miss the post-season.

Nashville Predators
As a free agent from the Jets, Sanford was signed to a one-year, $850,000 contract with the Nashville Predators on July 15, 2022. On November 22, 2022, the Predators placed Sanford on waivers. After clearing waivers, Sanford was assigned to the Predators AHL affiliate, the Milwaukee Admirals, the next day.

Career statistics

Awards and honors

References

External links
 

1994 births
Living people
American men's ice hockey left wingers
Boston College Eagles men's ice hockey players
Chicago Wolves players
Hershey Bears players
Ice hockey players from Massachusetts
Milwaukee Admirals players
Nashville Predators players
Ottawa Senators players
Pinkerton Academy alumni
Sportspeople from Salem, Massachusetts
St. Louis Blues players
San Antonio Rampage players
Stanley Cup champions
Washington Capitals draft picks
Washington Capitals players
Waterloo Black Hawks players
Winnipeg Jets players